Technosearch is the Annual Technical Festival of MANIT Bhopal. Since its inception in 2003, Technosearch has done lots of technical as well as cultural events. The participation for Technosearch has been growing exponentially, easily evident from the footfall of over 15000 in the 2017 installment.{
  "type": "FeatureCollection",
  "features": [
    {
      "type": "Feature",
      "properties": {},
      "geometry": {
        "type": "Point",
        "coordinates": [
          77.40620040945943,
          23.216380833937855
        ]
      }
    }
  ]
}
Technosearch is studded with workshops, seminars and riveting ProNites to sum up the day's events. TS has had previous rosters of artists like Hardy Sandhu, DJ Carnivore and Siana Catherine. It is one of the largest Technical Fests in Central India.

History and growth 
Technosearch started out in 2003 to increase the technical culture of NIT-Bhopal. It aims to create practical knowledge and infuse the spirit of curiosity and innovation in the students of NIT- Bhopal. Through the years, Technosearch has enlarged and has now become a very large technical festival in Central India. Technosearch organizes a wide range of contests, workshops and events encompassing different genres of technology with the aim to "infuse a scientific and rational temperament in the young minds."

Flagship events 
Market Guru: Marketing and management event by Intellect Browsers' Consortium (IBC) with the popular tagline "Invest. Build. Compete".

Illuminati: Full-scale literary event by Drishtant, the literary society of MANIT, Bhopal.

Code Kriegers:Can you win the game of codes? All you need is to crack some. A popular coding event organised by Vision, technical society of MANIT, Bhopal.

Kodachrome: A biannual photography exhibition organised by the PIXEL, photography and animation society of MANIT, Bhopal.

Robo-FIFA: Experience a real-time rigorous battle between robots on football field, another one of flagship event of Vision.

Quizzotica: A quizzing competition organised by Quizzers Club MANIT.

Crime Alley: A college wide treasure hunt organised by Rotaract Club, MANIT.

Workshops 
Embedded Systems Workshop

Quadcopter Workshop

Internet of Things Workshop

Humanoid Robotics Workshop

Automobile Workshop

References

Technology events